Devnagar is a village in Barmer District in the Indian state of Rajasthan.

Villages in Barmer district